Penicillium tropicoides is a species of fungus in the genus Penicillium.

References

Further reading 
 

tropicoides
Fungi described in 2010